Crooked Creek is a neighborhood located in Milton, Georgia (formerly Alpharetta). Surrounded by the Iron Horse Golf Club, it has 640 homes on over 500 acres of rolling hills.

References

Populated places in Fulton County, Georgia